Nedim Özbey (born 28 February 1955) is a Turkish volleyball coach. He's been coaching Turkish side Galatasaray since 2015.

External links
 Coach profile at WorldofVolley.com 
 Coach profile at Volleybox.net
 Coach profile at Galatasaray.org

1955 births
Living people
Galatasaray S.K. (men's volleyball) coaches
Turkish volleyball coaches
Sportspeople from Istanbul